The Suruí are an indigenous people of Brazil who live in the state of Pará. They are a different people than the Suruí do Jiparaná.

Name
The Suruí are also known as the Suruí, Sororós, Aikewara, Akewara, and Akewere people.

Language
The Suruí do Pará language belongs to Subgroup IV of the Tupi-Guarani language family. It is written in the Latin script, and literacy rates in the language are extremely low.

History
First prolonged contact with the modern world came in the late 1960s. The tribe was decimated by disease. In 1960, they experienced an influenza epidemic, followed by a smallpox epidemic in 1962. The Suruí fled their homeland due to attacks by the Xikrin people.

See also
 Indigenous peoples in Brazil
 List of Indigenous peoples in Brazil

Notes

Ethnic groups in Brazil
Indigenous peoples in Brazil
Indigenous peoples of the Amazon